Miss International Queen 2018, the 13th Miss International Queen pageant, was held on March 9, 2018, at Pattaya City in Thailand. Jiratchaya Sirimongkolnawin from Thailand crowned her successor Nguyễn Hương Giang from Vietnam at the end of the event.

Starting from 2018, the pageant requires only one delegate from each country unlike past editions. The mission of the pageant aims towards LGBTQ and Transgender awareness and equality in both society and workforce, while all the monetary profits of the actual televised show goes to the Royal Charity AIDS Foundation of Thailand.

Results

Placements

§ – Placed into the Top 12 by winning Most Popular Introductory Video

Special awards

Best in Talent

Contestants
28 contestants competed for the title.

Debuts

Returns 
Last competed in 2015:

 

Last competed in 2015:

 

Last competed in 2014:

References

External links
 

2018 beauty pageants
2018
Beauty pageants in Thailand